Frederik Møller (born 8 July 1993) is a retired Danish footballer who played as a left-back.

Club career

FC Midtjylland
Møller is a product of FC Midtjylland and their cooperative club Ikast FS. Møller started playing in FC Midtjylland at the age of 12. He was loaned out to Hobro IK in August 2012 until January 2013, where he played 10 league games for the club.

He was moved up to the first team in the summer 2012, after signing a new 5-year contract. However, he didn't play so many games as he expected, and he left the club after 10 years, in the summer 2015.

AC Horsens
AC Horsens announced in August 2015, that they had signed Møller from FC Midtjylland.

Møller was one out of 15 players in the Danish Superliga, that had played all matches during the first half season in 2016. After a game against Brøndby IF in March 2017, Møller was taken to the hospital after only playing 36 minutes of the game. It turned out he had a concussion and he later said, that he the first three days had laid down in a dark closet where he couldn’t do anything.

On 27 June 2017 AC Horsens confirmed, that Møller wouldn't extend his contract and therefore would leave the club.

AGF
On 2 July 2017, Møller signed with AGF.

Retirement
After more than a year without a club, 28-year old Møller confirmed on 5 October 2021, that he had retired from professional football, following two heart attacks in the summer of 2020.

Disease
Møller is color blind, and can't see the difference between many colors.

References

External links
 Danish national team profile
 Frederik Møller at Soccerway

1993 births
Living people
Danish men's footballers
Denmark under-21 international footballers
Association football defenders
FC Midtjylland players
Hobro IK players
AC Horsens players
Aarhus Gymnastikforening players
Silkeborg IF players
Danish Superliga players
Danish 1st Division players
People from Ikast-Brande Municipality
Sportspeople from the Central Denmark Region